Wharton may refer to:

Academic institutions
 Wharton School of the University of Pennsylvania
 Wharton County Junior College
 Paul R. Wharton High School
 Wharton Center for Performing Arts, at Michigan State University

Places
 Wharton, Cheshire, England
 Wharton, Cumbria, England
 Wharton, New Jersey, USA
 Wharton, Ohio, USA
 Wharton, Texas, USA
 Wharton, West Virginia, USA
 Wharton Township, Fayette County, Pennsylvania, USA
 Wharton Township, Potter County, Pennsylvania, USA
 Wharton Basin, the north-eastern part of the Indian Ocean
 Wharton Creek (Unadilla River), a stream in the U.S. state of New York
 Wharton State Forest, New Jersey, USA
 Mount Wharton, Antarctica

People
 Wharton (name), including a list of people with the name

See also

Warton (disambiguation)